HMS Lion was a Dutch hoy that the Admiralty purchased in 1794. She was commissioned into the Royal Navy in March 1794 under Lieutenant Stephen Donovan. She and several of her sister ships (and ), formed part of a short-lived squadron under Philippe d'Auvergne at Jersey. The navy sold her at Jersey on 20 November 1795.

Citations and references
Citations

References
 

Sloops of the Royal Navy
1790s ships